The 2022–23 DFB-Pokal is the 42nd season of the annual German football cup competition. Forty-eight teams participate in the competition, including all teams from the previous year's Frauen-Bundesliga and the 2. Frauen-Bundesliga, excluding second teams. The competition will begin on 21 August 2021 with the first of six rounds and will end on 28 May 2022 with the final at the RheinEnergieStadion in Cologne, a nominally neutral venue, which has hosted the final since 2010.

VfL Wolfsburg are the eight-time defending champions.

Participating clubs
The following clubs qualified for the competition:

Format
Clubs from lower leagues will host against clubs from higher leagues until the quarter-finals. Should both clubs play below the 2. Bundesliga, there will be no host club change anymore.

Schedule
The rounds of the 2022–23 competition are scheduled as follows:

Times up to 29 October 2022 and from 26 March 2023 are CEST (UTC+2). Times from 30 October 2022 to 25 March 2023 are CET (UTC+1).

First round
The draw was made on 1 July 2022, with Sabine Mammitzsch drawing the matches. The teams were split in a North and South group. The matches will take place between 20 and 22 August 2022. All clubs from the 2021–22 Frauen-Bundesliga and the four best-placed teams from the 2021–22 2. Frauen-Bundesliga received a bye.

Second round
The draw was held on 22 August 2022 with Turid Knaak drawing the matches. The teams were split in a North and South group. All clubs from the 2021–22 Frauen-Bundesliga and the four best-placed teams from the 2021–22 2. Frauen-Bundesliga will join in this round. The matches took place from 10 to 12 September 2022.

Round of 16
The draw was held on 18 September 2022 with Dietmar Hamann drawing the matches. The matches will take place from 19 to 20 November 2022.

Quarter-finals
The draw was held on 20 November 2022 with Marie-Louise Eta drawing the matches. The matches took place on 28 February 2023.

Semi-finals
The draw was held on 5 March 2023 with Mirko Slomka drawing the matches. The matches will take place on 15 and 16 April 2023.

Final
The final will take place on 18 May 2023 at the RheinEnergieStadion in Cologne.

Top goalscorers

The following players were the top scorers of the DFB-Pokal, sorted first by number of goals, and then alphabetically if necessary. Goals scored in penalty shoot-outs are not included.

References

Women
2022–23